Yakunino is a rural locality in Klyukvinsky Selsoviet Rural Settlement, Kursky District, Kursk Oblast, Russia. Population:

Geography 
The village is located on the Seym River (a left tributary of the Desna), 101 km from the Russia–Ukraine border, 10 km east of the district center – the town Kursk, 3.5 km from the selsoviet center – Dolgoye.

 Climate
Yakunino has a warm-summer humid continental climate (Dfb in the Köppen climate classification).

Transport 
Yakunino is located 3 km from the federal route  (Kursk – Voronezh –  "Kaspy" Highway; a part of the European route ), on the road of intermunicipal significance  (R-298 – Klyukva – Yakunino), 4 km from the nearest railway station Konaryovo (railway line Klyukva — Belgorod).

The rural locality is situated 10 km from Kursk Vostochny Airport, 116 km from Belgorod International Airport and 196 km from Voronezh Peter the Great Airport.

References

Notes

Sources

Rural localities in Kursky District, Kursk Oblast